Wulgrin III of Angoulême, also known as Wulgrin Taillefer II, inherited the title of Count of Angoulême and its territories from his father, William VI of Angoulême, in 1179.

His untimely death was the first break in the house of Taillefer, which had ruled Angoulême since the days of the Carolingians. As he had only one daughter, Mathilde of Angoulême, the territory went to his younger brother, William VII of Angoulême. Wulgrin's daughter, Mathilde, would marry Hugh IX of Lusignan, who would eventually inherit the kingdom, over the claims of John of England, through Isabella of Angoulême, the daughter of Aymer of Angoulême, the third and youngest brother.

References

Sources

Histoire P@ssion - Chronologie historique des Comtes d’Angoulême (in French)
L'art de Verifier des Faits historiques, des Chartes, des Chroniques, et Autres Anciens Monuments, Depuis la Naissance de Notre-Seigner by Moreau et Yalade, 1818, Page 189
The coinage of the European continent, by Swan Sonnenschein, 1893,  Page 276
Annuaire Historique Pour L'annee 1854, by Société de l'histoire de France, Page 180
Nouvelle Encyclopedie Theologique, by acques-Paul Migne, 1854, Page 903
Geoffrey of Vigeois. "Chronica Gaufredi coenobitae monasterii D. Martialis Lemovicensis, ac prioris Vosiensis coenobii." In Novae bibliothecae manuscriptorum librorum tomus secundus: rerum aquitanicarum. . . . Edited by Philippe Labbe, 279–342. Paris: Sebastian Cramoisy, 1657. (His chronicle, in Latin, on Gallica)
Watson, Rowan Charles. "The Counts of Angoulême from the 9th to the Mid 13th Century." PhD diss., University of East Anglia, 1979.

House of Taillefer
Counts of Angoulême